Thomas Victor Longo (February 21, 1942 – July 2, 2015) was an American football defensive back who played three seasons in the National Football League with the New York Giants and St. Louis Cardinals. He was drafted by the Philadelphia Eagles in the fourteenth round of the 1965 NFL Draft. He was also selected by the Oakland Raiders in the eleventh round of the 1965 AFL Redshirt Draft. Longo played college football at the University of Notre Dame and attended Lyndhurst High School in Lyndhurst, New Jersey.

College career
Longo first played quarterback, then running back and defensive back for the Notre Dame Fighting Irish.

Professional career
Longo was selected by the Philadelphia Eagles with the 188th pick in the 1965 NFL Draft. He was also selected by the Oakland Raiders in the eleventh round of the 1965 AFL Redshirt Draft.

Longo played in 27 games, starting fourteen, for the New York Giants from 1969 to 1970. He played in two games for the St. Louis Cardinals in 1971.

Personal life
Longo was active with the NFL Retired Players Foundation. He died of mesothelioma on July 2, 2015.

References

External links
Just Sports Stats

1942 births
2015 deaths
Players of American football from New Jersey
American football defensive backs
Lyndhurst High School alumni
Notre Dame Fighting Irish football players
New York Giants players
Sportspeople from Bergen County, New Jersey
St. Louis Cardinals (football) players
People from Lyndhurst, New Jersey
Deaths from mesothelioma
Deaths from cancer in New Jersey